Piola Vago are a Cumbia Villera ("shantytown cumbia") band from Buenos Aires, Argentina.  Their line-up includes famous Argentina and Boca Juniors football player Carlos Tevez and his brother Diego.

Piola Vago is a band that was started in the slums of Villa de Los Andes (Fuerte Apache)

External links
MySpace Site

Argentine musical groups